Hearts That Meet is a 1914 Swedish silent drama film directed by Victor Sjöström.

Cast
 Greta Almroth - Albert's Sister
 John Ekman
 Alfred Lundberg - Eberling
 Richard Lund - Engineer
 Karin Molander - Margot
 Jenny Tschernichin-Larsson - Mrs. Ström
 August Warberg
 Carlo Wieth - Albert

References

External links

1914 films
1910s Swedish-language films
Swedish drama films
Swedish silent short films
Swedish black-and-white films
1914 drama films
1914 short films
Films directed by Victor Sjöström
Silent drama films